Pierre Cayet (born 7 July 1999) is a French professional footballer who plays as a defender for MLS Next Pro club New England Revolution II.

Career

Youth
Cayet played with the Angers SCO academy. Here he went on to play 11 games for the team's Championnat National 3 reserve side.

College & Amateur
In 2018, Cayet opted to move to the United States to play college soccer at Temple University. Cayet played three seasons with the Owls, including a truncated 2020 season due to the COVID-19 pandemic, making 47 appearances, scoring 5 goals and tallying 2 assists. In 2018 he was named the team's Defensive MVP and in 2019, Cayet earned Second Team All-AAC and Third Team All-Region honors. In 2020, Cayet again earned All-AAC First Team honors.

During the 2019 season, Cayet also appeared for USL League Two side Long Island Rough Riders. He made 6 appearances for the team.

Professional
On 28 April 2021, Cayet signed with USL League One side New England Revolution II. He debuted for the club on 16 May 2021, starting in a 2–2 draw with Chattanooga Red Wolves.

References

External links
Pierre Cayet - Men's Soccer Temple Athletics

1999 births
Angers SCO players
Association football defenders
Championnat National 3 players
Expatriate soccer players in the United States
French footballers
French expatriate footballers
French expatriate sportspeople in the United States
Living people
Long Island Rough Riders players
MLS Next Pro players
New England Revolution II players
Temple Owls men's soccer players
USL League One players
USL League Two players